Petrosyan, Petrosian or Petrossian (Eastern Armenian), Bedrosian or Bedrossian (Western Armenian) is a common surname in Armenia. It is a patronymic from the Armenian first name Petros (equivalent to Peter, making the name effectively equivalent to Peterson).

The following people share this surname:

Petrosyan
Arevik Petrosyan (born 1972), Armenian politician and lawyer
Armen Petrosyan (born 1986), Armenian-Italian kickboxer
Armenak Petrosyan (born 1973), Armenian professional footballer
Artur Petrosyan (born 1971), Armenian professional footballer
Galust Petrosyan (born 1981), Armenian professional footballer
Giorgio Petrosyan (born 1985), Armenian-Italian kickboxer
Leonard Petrosyan (1953–1999), Nagorno-Karabakh Republic politician; second Nagorno-Karabakh Republic President (March September 1997)
Mariam Petrosyan (born 1969), Armenian painter, cartoonist and novelist
Petros Petrosyan (1968–2012), Armenian painter
Sergey Petrosyan (born 1988), Russian weightlifter of Armenian descent
Vardan Petrosyan (born 1959), Armenian actor, scriptwriter, and parodist
Vardges Petrosyan (1932–1994), Armenian writer
Yevgeny Petrosyan (born 1945), Russian stand-up comedian of Armenian descent

Petrosian
Arshak Petrosian (born 1953), Armenian chess grandmaster
Mahaya Petrosian (born 1970), Iranian actress of Armenian descent
Manouk Petrosian (1676–1749), Armenian scholar and theologian
Tigran Petrosian (1929–1984), Soviet-Armenian chess grandmaster and world champion
Tigran L. Petrosian (born 1984), Armenian chess grandmaster
Vahé Petrosian, American astrophysicist and cosmologist

Petrossian
Petrossian (business), French international enterprise in trade of caviar and wide range of products
Armen Petrossian, French-Armenian businessman and director of Petrossian enterprise
Melkoum Petrossian, French-Armenian business, co-founder of Petrossian enterprise
Mouchegh Petrossian, French-Armenian business, co-founder of Petrossian enterprise
Marine Petrossian (born 1960),  Armenian poet, essayist and columnist

Ter-Petrosyan / Ter-Petrossian
 Levon Ter-Petrosyan (born 1945), Armenian politician; first Armenian President (1991–1998)
 Semeno Ter-Petrosian (1882–1922), Bolshevik revolutionary known as Kamo

Pedrossian
Pedro Pedrossian (1928-2017), Brazilian politician, Governor of Mato Grosso do Sul (1980-1983 and 1991–1994)

Bedrosian
Cam Bedrosian (born 1991), American baseball player
Steve Bedrosian (born 1957), American former Major League Baseball player

Bedrossian
Ara Bedrossian, Cypriot professional footballer
Pascal Bedrossian (born 1974), French professional footballer

Armenian-language surnames
Patronymic surnames
Surnames from given names
Surnames of Armenian origin